The men's team épée was one of eight fencing events on the fencing at the 1976 Summer Olympics programme. It was the fifteenth appearance of the event. The competition was held from 28 to 29 July 1976. 85 fencers from 19 nations competed.

Rosters

Argentina
 Daniel Feraud
 Fernando Lupiz
 Juan Daniel Pirán
 Omar Vergara

Austria
 Herbert Lindner
 Karl-Heinz Müller
 Herbert Polzhuber
 Peter Zobl-Wessely

Canada
 Alain Dansereau
 Michel Dessureault
 Geza Tatrallyay
 George Varaljay

Finland
 Heikki Hulkkonen
 Risto Hurme
 Jussi Pelli
 Veikko Salminen

France
 Philippe Boisse
 François Jeanne
 Philippe Riboud
 Jacques La Degaillerie

Great Britain
 Teddy Bourne
 Bill Hoskyns
 Ralph Johnson
 Tim Belson
 Martin Beevers

Hong Kong
 Chan Matthew
 Denis Cunningham
 Kam Roger
 Ng Wing Biu

Hungary
 Csaba Fenyvesi
 Sándor Erdős
 István Osztrics
 Pál Schmitt
 Győző Kulcsár

Iran
 Sarkis Assatourian
 Iraj Dastgerdi
 Ali Asghar Pashapour-Alamdari
 Esfandihar Zarnegar

Italy
 John Pezza
 Nicola Granieri
 Fabio Dal Zotto
 Marcello Bertinetti
 Giovanni Battista Coletti

Norway
 Nils Koppang
 Jeppe Normann
 Kjell Otto Moe
 Bård Vonen
 Ole Mørch

Poland
 Jerzy Janikowski
 Zbigniew Matwiejew
 Leszek Swornowski
 Marceli Wiech

Romania
 Ioan Popa
 Anton Pongratz
 Nicolae Iorgu
 Paul Szabo

Soviet Union
 Aleksandr Abushakhmetov
 Viktor Modzalevsky
 Vasyl Stankovych
 Aleksandr Bykov
 Boris Lukomsky

Sweden
 Carl von Essen
 Hans Jacobson
 Rolf Edling
 Leif Högström
 Göran Flodström

Switzerland
 Daniel Giger
 Christian Kauter
 Michel Poffet
 François Suchanecki
 Jean-Blaise Evéquoz

Thailand
 Sneh Chousurin
 Taweewat Hurapan
 Sutipong Santitevagul
 Royengyot Srivorapongpant
 Samachai Trangjaroenngarm

United States
 Scotty Bozek
 Brooke Makler
 George Masin
 Paul Pesthy

West Germany
 Hans-Jürgen Hehn
 Volker Fischer
 Alexander Pusch
 Reinhold Behr
 Hanns Jana

Results

Round 1

Round 1 Pool A 

Great Britain and West Germany each defeated Austria, 11–5 and 10–6, respectively. The two victors then faced off. West Germany won 9–5.

Round 1 Pool B 

The first two rounds of matches left Hungary and France at 2–0 apiece (advancing to the knockout rounds) and Finland and Poland at 0–2 each (eliminating them). Hungary defeated France 8–2 (with one double-loss ensuring that France could not catch Hungary) to take the top spot in the group. Great Finland and Poland did not face each other.

Round 1 Pool C 

The first two rounds of matches left Sweden and Italy at 2–0 apiece (advancing to the knockout rounds) and Iran and Hong Kong at 0–2 each (eliminating them). Sweden defeated Italy 9–7 to take the top spot in the group. Great Finland and Poland did not face each other.

Round 1 Pool D 

The first two rounds of matches left Switzerland and Norway at 2–0 apiece (advancing to the knockout rounds) and Canada and Argentina at 0–2 each (eliminating them). Switzerland defeated Norway 9–7 to take the top spot in the group. Canada defeated Argentina, 8–8, winning on touches 68–66, to take third.

Round 1 Pool E 

The first two rounds of matches left the Soviet Union and Romania at 2–0 apiece (advancing to the knockout rounds) and the United States and Thailand at 0–2 each (eliminating them). The Soviet Union defeated Romania 9–4 to take the top spot in the group. The United States defeated Thailand, also 9–4, to take third.

This was the only group where the second-place team advanced directly to the quarterfinals instead of the round of 16.

Elimination rounds

Main bracket

5th place consolation bracket

References

Fencing at the 1976 Summer Olympics
Men's events at the 1976 Summer Olympics